Pennsauken Transit Center is a New Jersey Transit train station in Pennsauken Township, in Camden County, New Jersey, United States. It serves as an intermodal transfer station between the light rail River Line and the commuter rail Atlantic City Line, as well as serving the Delair neighborhood for Pennsauken and the nearby industrial park. The station cost $39.747 million, of which $39.104 million was funded by the American Recovery and Reinvestment Act of 2009. After two years of construction, the Pennsauken Transit Center opened on October 14, 2013.

Configuration

The Atlantic City Line crosses above the River Line on a high embankment at the station connection. The two levels are connected by a 38-foot-tall three-story building, which features a glass façade designed by local artist J. Kenneth Leap as a tribute to women in Pennsauken's history. The station has 275 free parking spaces available to commuters. Like most NJT stations, tickets are purchased at automatic ticket machines. 

As well as the station itself, the project included several new crossovers and signal installations to increase operating flexibility.

Station layout

History

When the River Line opened in 2004, it did not include a stop in the Delair neighborhood nor a connection with the Atlantic City Line. Local opinion favored an infill station be built; planning began in earnest in 2007.

New Jersey Transit filed an environmental assessment for the project in August 2009, and received a Finding of No Significant Impact (FONSI) from the United States Environmental Protection Agency in October 2009. A ground breaking ceremony was held for the station on October 19, 2009. Construction of the River Line platform began soon after. The $13.8 million second phase of construction – the Atlantic City Line platforms, parking lot, and drainage improvements – was approved by the New Jersey Transit Board of Directors on July 13, 2011.

Construction was nearly complete by the second quarter of 2013, with only minor work remaining. In late September, New Jersey Transit announced that the station would open in mid-October. Both levels of the station opened to passenger service on October 14, 2013.

In June 2014, NJT introduced a through-fare ticket which allows for travel on the Northeast Corridor Line, the RiverLine, and the Atlantic City Line, which encourages connections between the lines via Pennsauken.

References

External links

Pennsauken Transit Center Station Parking Info
Pennsauken Transit Center Construction

NJ Transit Rail Operations stations
Pennsauken Township, New Jersey
Railway stations in the United States opened in 2013
River Line stations
Railway stations in Camden County, New Jersey
Amtrak Thruway Motorcoach stations in New Jersey